Trikomo (Bulgarian: Залово - Zalovo), before 1927 known as Zalovo (Ζάλοβο), is a settlement and a community in the municipal unit Theodoros Ziakas, in Grevena regional unit, Greece. The 2011 census gives its population as 128. The community has an area of 16.853 km2.

Notes

Populated places in Grevena (regional unit)